Georges de Feure (real name Georges Joseph van Sluijters, 6 September 1868 – 26 November 1943) was a French painter, theatrical designer, and industrial art designer in the symbolism and Art Nouveau styles.

De Feure was born in Paris. His father was an affluent Dutch architect, and his mother was Belgian. De Feure had two sons, Jean Corneille and Pierre Louis, in the early 1890s with his mistress Pauline Domec and a daughter with his first wife Marguerite Guibert (married 7 July 1897).

In 1886, de Feure was one of the eleven students admitted at the Rijkscademie voor Beeldende Kunsten in Amsterdam, which he did however leave very quickly for Paris since he felt that formal academic training had nothing to offer him. Being of very independent nature, de Feure never again took up formal artistic studies, and forged his own independent path. He was however influenced by Jules Chéret in his posters for the café concert but most likely was never his pupil and became the key designer of Siegfried Bing for L'Art Nouveau.

He showed work in the Exposition Universelle de Paris exhibition in 1900. He designed furniture, worked for newspapers, created theater designs for Le Chat Noir cabaret and posters. In August 1901, de Feure was nominated Chevalier de la Légion d'honneur for his contribution to the decorative arts. He died in poverty at the age of 75 years in Paris.

Gallery

Further reading

 George de Feure: 1868–1928 / Ian Millman.- Amsterdam: Van Gogh Museum; Zwolle: Wanders [Distr.]. I11.- (19th century masters;4) 
 Ian Millman Georges de Feure : maître du symbolisme et de l'Art nouveau, A.C.R. Edition internationale, Paris-Courbevoie 1992

External links

1868 births
1928 deaths
Art Nouveau painters
Art Nouveau designers
French designers
19th-century French painters
French male painters
20th-century French painters
20th-century French male artists
Painters from Paris
Chevaliers of the Légion d'honneur
19th-century French male artists